This article provides details of international football games played by the Czech Republic national football team from 2020 to present.

Results

2020

2021

2022

Forthcoming fixtures
The following matches are scheduled:

Head to head records

Notes

References

Czech Republic national football team results
2020s in Czech sport